Felis Creations is a Bangalore, Karnataka-based film production company founded in 2006 by Sandesh Kadur. It produces factual programs for international broadcast. Felis Creations is also involved in wildlife documentation and conservation activities in collaboration with Wildlife Conservation Organizations. Felis creations was the producer for recent TV series Planet Earth II broadcast by the BBC.

Collaborations
Felis Creations is a content partner with photography organizations like International League of Conservation Photographers and ARKive. It also collaborates with wildlife organizations like Wildlife SOS and Gorgas Science Foundation, Meet Your Neighbours.

Current & Past Productions

Books

Other Projects

Felis images
Felis images is the stock photo department, which is a supplier of stock images for magazines and wildlife field guides. The company also caters wildlife footage to broadcast corporations like BBC and National Geographic Channel under the name Felis Images

References

External links
 Felis Creations Official Website
 Felis Images
 Sandesh Kadur

2006 establishments in Karnataka
Film production companies of India
Film production companies based in Bangalore
Mass media companies established in 2006